Kynžvart Castle (German: Schloss Königswart) is a historic château located near Lázně Kynžvart in the Cheb District of the Czech Republic. The building's architecture is in the neoclassical style. After extensive renovations, the castle was reopened to the public in 2000. A guided tour takes visitors through 25 rooms of the castle.

History

The first Schloss Königswart, built before 1600, collapsed. After the Battle of White Mountain during the Thirty Years' War, the remains of the castle were confiscated and by 1630 granted to the Metternich family. From 1682 to 1691, Count Philipp Emmerich von Metternich (1621-1698) turned the decayed ruins into a Baroque residence. From 1821 to 1836, the Austrian Chancellor Klemens Wenzel von Metternich remodeled the building in the neoclassical style with the help of architect Pietro Nobile.

The castle was confiscated from the Metternich family in 1945 by the Czechoslovak government.

The castle has a library that includes over 200 examples of incunabula, medieval manuscripts, valuable prints, scientific books, and scientific encyclopedias. In 1828, a museum was founded to display the castle's natural science collections, coins, historical and technological curiosities, manuscripts, ancient Egyptian monuments, marble sculptures, and pieces of Oriental art.

See also
List of castles in the Czech Republic

References

External links

 Official website (in Czech)
 Kynžvart Castle information

Cheb District
Castles in the Karlovy Vary Region
House of Metternich
Museums in the Karlovy Vary Region
Historic house museums in the Czech Republic
National Cultural Monuments of the Czech Republic